Ponta Preta (Portuguese meaning "black tip") is a headland in the southwest of the island of Sal in Cape Verde. It is about 2 km west of the town Santa Maria and about 2 km of Ponta do Sinó, the southernmost point of the island. It lies within the nature reserve Ponta do Sinó, at the edge of a tourism development zone.

See also
List of beaches in Cape Verde
Tourism in Cape Verde

References

Santa Maria, Cape Verde
Headlands of Cape Verde
Preta